Chamarajapuram is a railway station on Mysore–Chamarajanagar branch line. The station is located in Chamarajapuram, Mysore district, Karnataka state, India.

Location
Chamarajapuram railway station is located near Ballal Circle in K. G. Koppal, Mysore.

History 
There are six trains running forward and backward in this route. Five of them are slow-moving passenger trains.

References

Railway stations in Mysore district
Mysore South